An election to Cork City Council took place on 10 June 1999 as part of that year's Irish local elections. 31 councillors were elected from six local electoral areas on the system of proportional representation by means of the single transferable vote (PR-STV) for a five-year term of office.

Results by party

Results by Electoral Area

Cork North-Central

Cork North-East

Cork North-West

Cork South-Central

Cork South-East

Cork South-West

External links
 http://www.corkcity.ie/

1999 Irish local elections
1999